Cheriyal (or Cherial) is a town and a municipality in Siddipet district in the state of Telangana in India.

Panchayats 
The following is the list of village panchayats in Cheriyal:

 Mustiyal
 Veerannapet
 Vechareni
 Kishtampet
 Dommata
 Danampally
 Pothireddypally
 Gurjakunta
 Nagapuri
 Aakunoor
 Guruvannapeta 
 Komuravelly
 Kishtampet
 Gourayapalli
 TapasPally
 Aianapur
 Kadavergu
 Rampoor
 Rasulabad
 Marrimuchal
 Chityal

See also
 Cheriyal scroll painting
 Nakashi art

References 

Villages in Siddipet district
Mandal headquarters in Siddipet district